James Marshall Reilly (born September 21, 1981, in New York City) is an American talent agent, entrepreneur, author, public speaker and musician.

Reilly is best known as the founder and CEO of The Guild Agency Speakers Bureau & Intellectual Talent Management.

His business book Shake The World: It’s Not About Finding a Job, It’s About Creating a Life was published by Penguin Books in December 2011. His second book, One Great Speech: Secrets, Stories, and Perks of the Paid Speaking Industry (And How You Can Break In), was published by Sourcebooks in October 2020.

A former professional musician, Reilly often lectures on topics that include the Millennial Generation, the job market, and corporate social responsibility.

He has been featured as an expert in a variety of media outlets, including Inc Magazine,Fortune Magazine, the Los Angeles Times, the Financial Times,Thrive Global, the New York Post, International Business Times, and Fast Company,.

From 2011 to 2014, his writings on entrepreneurship appeared regularly in the Huffington Post.

In November 2011, he was invited to the White House to be honored as one of the top entrepreneurs under the age of 30 in the United States.The Guild Agency Speakers Bureau & Intellectual Talent Management, Inc. – Empact100. Retrieved October 23, 2012.

Business career
Reilly's business career began when he was in college, originally as a musician and then as an entertainment manager.

In 2011, he founded The Guild Agency Speakers Bureau & Intellectual Talent Management, a talent agency that represented public figures and celebrities for speaking engagements and book publishing.

The agency's clients included TOMS founder Blake Mycoskie, Academy Award winner Patricia Arquette, bestselling author Steven Kotler, World Series of Poker champion Phil Gordon, author and former Virgin America social media pundit Porter Gale, author Michael Ellsberg charity: water founder Scott Harrison, Life Is Good founder Bert Jacobs, and ESPN founder Bill Rasmussen.

The company's literary division sold several non-fiction books, including a book by Yes To Inc. co-founders Ido Leffler and Lance Kalish to Amazon Publishing, and a multi-book deal for FEED Projects co-founder Ellen Gustafson, which was acquired in a preempt by Rodale.

Reilly is a co-founder of the Silicon Valley-based tech company Fotition. Fotition has raised $2 million in venture capital from Starbucks and Intuit co-founder and billionaire Scott Cook.

From January 2020 until February 2022, Reilly served as Communications Manager at the Innocence Project, a non-profit organization headquartered in New York City, working with celebrity ambassadors who included Chris Martin of Coldplay, John Grisham, Stephen Colbert, Ryan Philippe, Joan Baez, Susan Sarandon, Zooey Deschanel, Whoopi Goldberg, and Esperanza Spalding.

Shake the WorldShake The World: It’s Not About Finding a Job, It’s About Creating a Life was released in the United States by Portfolio Penguin on December 29, 2011, to mostly favorable reviews.

The Financial Times called the book "A call to arms to the breathless young." Publishers Weekly wrote,  "Reilly’s tone is pleasantly idealistic and his lively style will engage young readers with its hopeful message that there are innovative alternatives to a traditional corporate career path." The Los Angeles Times stated, "For anyone looking for a present for an anxious 21-year-old, Reilly's book Shake the World: It's Not About Finding a Job, It's about Creating a Life is it. Just don't be surprised if they then ditch their plans to take a job in accounting, head off to dig irrigation ditches in Haiti, tweet the results and apply for the next round of TED (technology, entertainment, design) fellowships."

Favorable reviews also appeared in the New York Daily News and several other international publications.Shake The World received a mixed review from Kirkus Reviews, which stated that Reilly was "uncritical of those subjects and sometimes seems starry-eyed as he chronicles their generosities." Kirkus concluded that the book was "studded with inspirational gems."

One Great SpeechOne Great Speech: Secrets, Stories, and Perks of the Paid Speaking Industry (And How You Can Break In) was released in the United States by Sourcebooks on October 6, 2020, to favorable reviews. Booklist stated that "Readers will be drawn in to the well-organized and conversational style of the book...Reilly delivers hope that these people can join others in the accessible speaker's market to grow their brand and personal wealth."

Media appearances
Reilly is a former blogger for the Huffington Post. He has had articles and personal interviews appear in a variety of media outlets, including the New York Post, International Business Times, Under 30 CEO, Inc., on Blake Mycoskie's Start Something That Matters blog, in American Express Open Forum, Leadership Excellence Magazine'', Fast Company, and Monster.com.

Public speaking
Reilly has lectured and sat on panels discussing a variety of business and finance topics at business conferences and schools, including MIT, Microsoft, University Corporation for Atmospheric Research, Chicago Ideas Week, ViacomCBS, and the University of Wyoming.

Personal
Reilly lives in New York City's West Village.

References 

21st-century American businesspeople
American finance and investment writers
Living people
1981 births
American columnists
St. Lawrence University alumni
Journalists from New York City
People from Greenwich Village